Jodi Thelen (born June 12, 1962) is an American actress.

Born in St. Cloud, Minnesota, Thelen made her screen debut as Georgia Miles, "a willfully free-spirited girl, naive and narcissistic" in Four Friends in 1981.

Thelen appeared on Broadway in Brighton Beach Memoirs in 1983. Her off-Broadway credits include Springtime for Henry, Largo Desolato at The Public Theater, The Nice and the Nasty at Playwrights Horizons, The Chemistry of Change, and A Body of Water, in which she played the dual roles of Sandy and Malka. For the latter, Variety praised her "stunning transformation" between roles, while The New York Times noted the "welcome comic bite" of her Malka portrayal.

Thelen's television credits include Duet, Grace Under Fire, Touched by an Angel, Joan of Arcadia and Twin Peaks.

Additional screen credits
Four Friends (1981)
Twilight Time (1982)
The Black Stallion Returns (1983)
One Night Stand (1995)
Playback (1996)
The Wedding Singer (1998)
You're Still Young (2004)
Til Death Does His Part (2007)

References

External links

Jodi Thelen at the Off-Broadway Internet Database

1962 births
American film actresses
American stage actresses
American television actresses
Living people
People from St. Cloud, Minnesota
Actresses from Minnesota
21st-century American women